Steven Cottle (born 24 August 1984) is a New Zealand rower.

In 2006 Cottle was selected as the number two oarsman in the New Zealand coxed four, alongside James Dallinger, Paul Gerritsen, Dane Boswell and cox Daniel Quigley. They won gold at the FISA Under 23 World Championships also setting a new world-record time of 6.03 in Hazewinkel, Belgium  and bronze at the World Championships in Eton, UK.

References

1984 births
Living people
New Zealand male rowers
World Rowing Championships medalists for New Zealand